Le Puy is a commune in the Gironde department in Nouvelle-Aquitaine in southwestern France.

Economy
The economy is agricultural, with wheat, sunflowers and soya being grown in recent years to complement the more traditional plums and tobacco.

The locality produces the famous Entre deux mers wine.

Mill reservoirs can provide good fishing for roach, carp and pike.

The region is well known for its cèpes (boletus mushroom).

Geography
The river is an affluent of the right bank of the Gironde.

The alluvial plain of the Dropt is characterized by boulbène (a soil composed of clay and sand) terraces, rising to foothills of molasse (chalky sandstone sedimentary deposits)   with a few hillocks or the edges of chalky plateaus.

History
The town was a halting place on the pilgrimage to Santiago de Compostela.

The Sisters of St. Joseph were founded in Le Puy in 1650 by Jesuit Priest Jean Pierre Medaille.

The town lost 10 soldiers during World War I.

Population

Its inhabitants are known as Puylots.

Sights
 Valley of the Dropt industrial dairy 1945.  Manufactures butter and milk powder;
 Archives record three windmills at Saint-Batz;
 Parish church of Saint Anne;
 Friday market in Monségur, a 13th-century bastide (walled town).

See also
Communes of the Gironde department

References

External links

All sites in French, unless otherwise indicated:
 Valley of the Dropt
  Financial Data for Le Puy from the Ministry of the Economy, Finances and Industry
 Tax information for Le Puy (in English)
 
 Le Puy on Villorama site
 Le Puy on the Cassini map

Communes of Gironde
Gironde communes articles needing translation from French Wikipedia